Thilan Nimesh (born 29 November 1997) is a Sri Lankan cricketer. He made his List A debut for Galle District in the 2016–17 Districts One Day Tournament on 26 March 2017. Prior to his List A debut, he was part of Sri Lanka's squad for the 2016 Under-19 Cricket World Cup.

References

External links
 

1997 births
Living people
Sri Lankan cricketers
Galle District cricketers
Cricketers from Colombo
Alumni of Prince of Wales' College, Moratuwa